is a type of Kyō ware traditionally from Gojōzaka district near Kiyomizu Temple, in Kyoto.

The history of Kiyomizu ware dates back to the Momoyama period. The earlier production phase is known as Ko-Kiyomizu (old Kiyomizu).

References

External links 
 
 kiyomizuyaki.or.jp (in Japanese)
 Homepage of Unraku kiln

Culture in Kyoto Prefecture
Japanese pottery